Castlereagh is the name of a former barony in County Down, present-day Northern Ireland. It spanned the north-eastern area of the county bordering the baronies of: Ards to the east; Belfast to the north; Iveagh to the west south; and Dufferin, Kinelarty, and Lecale to the south. By 1841 the barony was divided into Castlereagh Lower and Castlereagh Upper.

References

County Down
Baronies of County Down
Former baronies of Ireland
Early Modern Ireland